This is a list of diplomatic missions in Atlanta. Atlanta is home to 26 diplomatic missions, the seventh-highest concentration of diplomatic missions in the U.S. The following are countries which have established a resident consular presence in Atlanta. For other diplomatic missions in the United States, see list of diplomatic missions in the United States.

Consulates

Source:

Honorary Consulates

 (vacant)
 (vacant)

 (vacant)

 (vacant)

Representative office
, Economic and Cultural Office

References

 - Georgia Consulates

See also

List of diplomatic missions of the United States
List of diplomatic missions in the United States

Diplomatic missions, Atlanta
Diplomatic